Sphaeronectidae is a family of cnidarians belonging to the order Siphonophorae.

Genera:
 Ediacara 
 Sphaeronectes Huxley, 1859

References

 
Calycophorae
Cnidarian families